Ithamar Conkey Sloan (May 9, 1822December 24, 1898) was an American educator, lawyer, and politician. A Republican, he served two terms in the United States House of Representatives, representing Wisconsin.  He was the brother of Andrew Scott Sloan. In historical documents his name is often abbreviated to

Biography

Born in Morrisville, New York, Sloan attended the common schools as a child, studied law and was admitted to the bar in 1848, commencing practice in Oneida County, New York. He moved to Janesville, Wisconsin, in 1854 where he continued to practice law. He served as district attorney of Rock County, Wisconsin, from 1858 to 1862 before being elected a Republican to the United States House of Representatives in 1862. He represented Wisconsin's 2nd congressional district in the 38th and 39th United States Congresses serving from March 4, 1863, to March 3, 1867. Sloan moved to Madison, Wisconsin, in 1875 where he became dean of the law department at the University of Wisconsin–Madison and as a special counsel for the State of Wisconsin in the Granger Law cases from 1874 to 1879. He died of a stroke at his home in Janesville, Wisconsin, on December 24, 1898, and was interred in Oak Hill Cemetery in Janesville.

His nephew, Henry Clay Sloan, was a member of the Wisconsin State Assembly.

References

External links
 
 

1822 births
1898 deaths
District attorneys in Wisconsin
New York (state) lawyers
University of Wisconsin Law School faculty
People from Oneida County, New York
Politicians from Janesville, Wisconsin
Politicians from Madison, Wisconsin
People of Wisconsin in the American Civil War
Republican Party members of the United States House of Representatives from Wisconsin
People from Morrisville, New York
19th-century American politicians
Lawyers from Madison, Wisconsin
19th-century American lawyers